Boavida is a surname. Notable people with the surname include:

Américo Boavida (1923–1968), Angolan physician 
Fernando Boavida (born 1959), Portuguese computer scientist
Madalena Boavida, East Timorese politician
Matías Boavida (born 1968), East Timorese politician and academic